Cedar Canyon may refer to:
 Cedar Canyon, Mid Hills, California, a canyon in San Bernardino County, California
 Cedar Canyon, San Ysidro Mountains, a canyon in the San Ysidro Mountains, San Diego County, California
 Cedar Canyon, South Dakota, an unincorporated community
 Cedar Canyon Bridge, a bridge in Arizona